Naïm Abou-Jaoudé, born on 9 July 1966 in Jal-El-Dib (Lebanon), is the Chief Executive Officer (CEO) of Candriam and Chairman of New York Life Investment Management International, which is the global investment manager branch of New York Life.

Candriam is a top tier asset manager in Europe, with $175 billion of Assets Under Management, part of New York Life Investment ($600bn of Assets Under Management).

Early life and education 
Naïm Abou-Jaoudé spent his early years in Lebanon before emigrating to Paris, France in 1978. He earned a graduate degree at the Institute of Political Studies in Paris (IEP-Sciences Po) and holds a master's degree in Economics and Finance from Université Paris II – Panthéon Assas.

Career 
Naïm Abou-Jaoudé has spent his entire career in finance, more particularly in asset management, covering Continental Europe, the UK, the Middle East, the USA and in Asia-Pacific. He started his career in 1990 at Transoptions Finance, a subsidiary of Crédit Agricole.

Between 1996 and 1999, he oversaw the investment management equities and derivatives department at Alfi Gestion and UBS Asset Management France; the company that was acquired by Dexia Asset Management in 1995.

From 2000 to 2006, he served as Chief Investment Officer (CIO) for alternative investments and a member of the Executive Committee of Dexia Asset Management.

In 2007, he held the positions of member of the Executive Committee of Dexia SA and Chairman of the Executive Committee of Dexia Asset Management, and was named Chief Executive Officer (CEO) of Dexia Asset Management.

Naïm Abou-Jaoudé was one of the key actors to lead the company through the 2008 financial industry turmoil. He also steered the acquisition of Dexia Asset Management by New York Life Investments, which was announced in February 2014. Dexia Asset Management then became a New York Life company and changed its name to "Candriam Investors Group", which stands for 'Conviction and Responsibility In Asset Management.'

Next to his role as CEO of Candriam, he was appointed Chairman of New York Life Investment Management International in September 2015, responsible for the activities and development of New York Life Investments' global business outside the USA.

Under the leadership of Naïm Abou-Jaoudé, Candriam diversified its positioning through three main acquisitions: a 40% stake in London-based private equity real estate manager Tristan Capital Partners, the integration of ABN Amro Investment Management's Paris-based direct investment management teams to Candriam, the transfer of Rothschild & Co alternative multi-asset unit, and the acquisition of a minority stake in Kartesia, a European private debt specialist.

In June 2021, Naïm was elected President of the European Fund and Asset Management Association (EFAMA), which is the voice of the EUR 27tn European investment management industry.

Social responsibility 
Candriam has been a pioneer in responsible investment portfolios since 1996. Under the leadership of Naïm Abou-Jaoudé, the company further developed its social responsibility engagement. His vision on the future of financial services, and in particular of asset management, is that it should be one of social responsibility and engagement. He has the strong belief that economic agents have a huge responsibility to future generations to help build a sustainable tomorrow.  

European CEO magazine named Naïm Abou-Jaoudé "Best CEO in the sustainable investment industry" and Hedge Fund Review rewarded Candriam with the “Best ESG/SRI management company” award in 2020.

Naïm Abou-Jaoudé is an active promoter of bridging the ESG knowledge gap in the finance industry. In 2017, Candriam developed the CANDRIAM Academy, a global sustainable investing educational resource, in order to help investors better understand how to analyse, identify, and evaluate sustainable investments. CANDRIAM Academy has more than 4,000 members who have conducted over 8,000 hours of accredited training across 15 countries.

He has also been a strong advocate of the development of numerous initiatives and partnerships between Candriam and top-tier academic bodies: LUMSA (Italy), KEDGE (France), Ecole Polytechnique (France), LSE (UK), Imperial College (UK) and Columbia (US), UCL (Belgium).

For instance, Naïm Abou-Jaoudé is overseeing a partnership between Candriam and Grantham Research Institute on Climate Change and the Environment (GRI) at the London School of Economics and Political Science (LSE) on the “Just Transition”. The initiative will facilitate innovative research, strengthen dialogue and promote the international exchange of ideas on ways to ensure that climate action delivers positive social impact.

Naïm Abou-Jaoudé has spoken at many international conferences to foster awareness and regularly refers to the 17 Sustainable Development Goals defined by the United Nations.

He has also led Candriam into new areas of the finance sphere: investing with a positive impact. Since 2014, Candriam has allocated over €5 billion towards companies that demonstrate innovation in biotech, healthcare, climate action, and circular economy. For instance, a dedicated oncology fund has helped advance AI-assisted cancer detection and personalised medicine, while also donating 10% of management fees to leading cancer research institutions.

References

Living people
Lebanese bankers
1966 births
Lebanese chief executives
Chief investment officers